Sereina Trachsel (born 9 February 1981) is a Swiss former racing cyclist. She was the Swiss National Road Race champion in 2004, 2005 and 2007.

References

External links
 

1981 births
Living people
Swiss female cyclists
People from Dielsdorf District
Sportspeople from the canton of Zürich